Éric Perrin (born November 1, 1975) is a Canadian former professional ice hockey centre that last played for JYP Jyväskylä in the Finnish Liiga. As of December 2017, he is the highest scoring foreign player in the history of Liiga.

Playing career
As a youth, Perrin played in the 1988 Quebec International Pee-Wee Hockey Tournament with a minor ice hockey team from Laval, Quebec.

Perrin played college hockey at the University of Vermont, where he played with future Tampa Bay Lightning team mate Martin St. Louis and Boston Bruins goaltender Tim Thomas. and went undrafted by the NHL. After spending several years playing minor league hockey, including a stint in Finland, Perrin was playing for the Hershey Bears when he was called up by the Lightning with 4 games left in the 2003–04 NHL season. He registered one assist in the playoffs on the way to the Lightning winning the Stanley Cup. Perrin is best friend of Lightning winger Martin St. Louis.

During the 2004–05 NHL lock-out, Perrin re-signed with the AHL Hershey Bears, where he was named the team's MVP, as well as the Man of the Year for his charitable contributions. The next season, rather than re-sign with the Bears, he elected to go back overseas, and signed with Swiss team SC Bern. During the Playoffs in the Swiss Nationalliga B he played with the EHC Biel. Once the Swiss season ended, he re-signed with the Tampa Bay Lightning, and on November 2, 2006, he scored his first NHL goal against the Philadelphia Flyers into an empty net in a 5-2 Lightning victory.

Perrin signed with the Atlanta Thrashers on July 1, 2007. In the 2007–08 NHL season with the Thrashers, he recorded career highs in assists (33) and points (45). He last played for the Atlanta Thrashers of the National Hockey League and he joined  Avangard Omsk of the KHL on September 3, 2009. Perrin was cut from his try-out with the Tampa Bay Lightning on October 5, 2010. In his NHL career he recorded 32 goals and 104 points in 245 games with the Tampa Bay Lightning and Atlanta Thrashers. He was also a member of the 2004 Stanley Cup winning Tampa Bay Lightning.

In October 2010 he signed a two-year deal to return with JYP of the SM-liiga.

On February 23, 2015, Perrin announced that JYP and he had come to a mutual agreement in which Perrin would leave JYP at the end of the 2014-15 Liiga season. On April 21, 2015, HC TPS announced they had signed Perrin as a free agent to a multi-year contract.

Prior to the 2018–19 season, Perrin continued his longevity in returning to former club, JYP Jyväskylä, on a one-year contract on June 11, 2018. On March 19 JYP lost on the first round of Liiga playoffs and Perrin retired.

Post retirement, he is Director of Hockey Operations for the youth travel hockey club DME Swamp Rabbits out of the Daytona Ice Arena in Daytona Beach, FL.

Career statistics

Awards and honours

References

External links

1975 births
Living people
Ässät players
Atlanta Thrashers players
Avangard Omsk players
Canadian ice hockey centres
Cleveland Lumberjacks players
EHC Biel players
Hershey Bears players
HPK players
Ice hockey people from Quebec
Jokerit players
JYP Jyväskylä players
Kansas City Blades players
Quebec Rafales players
SC Bern players
Sportspeople from Laval, Quebec
Stanley Cup champions
Tampa Bay Lightning players
HC TPS players
Undrafted National Hockey League players
Vermont Catamounts men's ice hockey players
Canadian expatriate ice hockey players in Finland
Canadian expatriate ice hockey players in Russia
Canadian expatriate ice hockey players in Switzerland
AHCA Division I men's ice hockey All-Americans